also known as Battle in 5 Seconds After Meeting is a Japanese manga series, written by Saizō Harawata and illustrated by Kashiwa Miyako. It has been serialized in Shogakukan's MangaONE app and Ura Sunday website since August 2015. It is a remake of Harawata's webcomic by the same name. An anime television series adaptation by SynergySP and Vega Entertainment (with CG animation by Studio A-Cat) aired from July to September 2021.

Synopsis

Characters
 
 
 A 16-year-old sophomore who does excellent academically, but likes gaming instead because it is "unpredictable". His ability is called "Sophist", an ability that allows him to use any ability which the other person (opponent or partner) believes he has. He is somehow labeled as "My Prince" by Mion.
 
 
 A 17-year-old high school girl who hates the word "coincidence" because she thinks that all the things that happen coincidentally lead to an unfortunate life. Her ability is called "Demon God" which allows her to multiply her physical ability by five times. She has feelings for Akira.
 
 
 A catgirl who is a cruel sadist, she is interested in seeing people slaughtering each other for her own sake of fun. She is one of the Observers.
 
 
 A delinquent. His ability is to turn any stick into a sword that can cut through anything, including the effects of other abilities.
 
 
 A wrestler. His ability is to become invincible for two seconds; this is shown visually as a suit of armour.
 
 
 A seductive and manipulative office lady who has the ability to create torture devices from body fluids.
 
 
 
 
 Mion's follower, dressed in Chinese style.

Media

Manga
Battle Game in 5 Seconds is created by Saizō Harawata. Harawata first launched the series as a webcomic and a remake illustrated by Kashiwa Miyako began publishing on Shogakukan's MangaONE app and Ura Sunday website on August 11 and August 18, 2015, respectively. Shogakukan has collected its chapters into individual tankōbon volumes. The first volume was released on February 26, 2016. As of November 2022, twenty-one volumes have been released.

Comikey is digitally publishing the manga in English since July 12, 2021. The manga is licensed in Indonesia by Elex Media Komputindo.

Volume list

Anime
In November 2020, it was announced that the manga would receive an anime television series adaptation. The series is animated by SynergySP and Vega Entertainment and directed by Nobuyoshi Arai with Meigo Naito serving as chief director, Touko Machida handling series composition, Studio A-Cat producing the CG animation, and Tomokatsu Nagasaku and Ikuo Yamamoto handling character designs. It aired from July 13 to September 28, 2021 on Tokyo MX and BS11. The opening theme song, "No Continue," is performed by Akari Kitō, while the ending theme song, is performed by 15-sai to Seiko Oomori. Crunchyroll licensed the series outside of Asia. Muse Communication licensed the series in South and Southeast Asia.

Episode list

Reception
As of November 2020, the manga had 2 million copies in circulation.

Battle Game in 5 Seconds has been nominated for the 67th Shogakukan Manga Award in the shōnen category in 2021.

Notes

References

External links
 
 
 

Action anime and manga
Anime series based on manga
Crunchyroll anime
Japanese webcomics
Muse Communication
Shogakukan manga
Shōnen manga
Studio A-Cat
Tokyo MX original programming
Webcomics in print